Halton was a provincial electoral district in Central Ontario, Canada. It elected one member to the Legislative Assembly of Ontario.

History
Until 1967, the electoral district was contiguous with the County of Halton.

Division (1967-1999)
The territory comprising Halton was redistributed on several occasions between 1967 and 1999:

 The Representation Act, 1966 divided the County into Halton East (consisting of Georgetown, Milton, Oakville and the southern part of Esquesing Township) and Halton West (consisting of Acton, Burlington, Nassagaweya Township and the northern part of Esquesing).
 The Representation Act, 1975 divided the new Regional Municipality of Halton into Burlington South, Halton-Burlington (consisting of Halton Hills, Milton and the northern part of Burlington) and Oakville.
 The Representation Act, 1986 divided the Region into Burlington South, Halton Centre (consisting of the northern parts of Burlington and Oakville and a southern part of Milton), Halton North (consisting of Halton Hills and the northern part of Milton) and Oakville South.

Alignment with federal electoral district (1999)
With the passage of the Representation Act, 1996, the electoral district of Halton was revived, and its boundaries were declared to be contiguous with those of the federal electoral district. Subsequent adjustments to boundaries have been consequential upon representation orders made under the federal Electoral Boundaries Readjustment Act that were subsequently incorporated into Ontario law.

The new riding included all of the Regional Municipality of Halton north of a line following Dundas Street to Highway 407 to Upper Middle Road to Walkers Line to the QEW to Burlington City limits to Upper Middle Road.

In 2007, the riding lost all of the Town of Halton Hills to Wellington—Halton Hills. Also, the border following the 407 was altered so that it follows Guelph Line instead. Also, the territory east of Eighth Line and south of Dundas Street was also lost.

Abolition (2018)
In 2018, the riding was divided into Milton, Oakville North—Burlington, Burlington, Mississauga—Streetsville and Mississauga—Erin Mills.

Members of Provincial Parliament

Election results (1999-2014)

2007 electoral reform referendum

Election results (1867-1967)

{{CANelec/source|Source: The Acton Free Press}}

Sources

Elections Ontario Past Election Results

Milton, Ontario
Politics of Burlington, Ontario
Politics of Oakville, Ontario
Former provincial electoral districts of Ontario